Basiti Qarteq (also Romanized as Bāsītī Qārteq) is a village in Bahmayi-ye Sarhadi-ye Sharqi Rural District, Dishmok District, Kohgiluyeh County, Kohgiluyeh and Boyer-Ahmad Province, Iran. At the 2006 census, its population was 24 (made up of 5 families).

References 

Populated places in Kohgiluyeh County